East Carolina University began playing organized American football in 1932 and has had many players go on to play professionally after graduating from the university. The school's first-ever selection was Roger Thrift, a quarterback, who was picked by the Cleveland Browns in the 1951 NFL Draft. The team's selection in the most recent draft, the 2021 NFL Draft, was offensive tackle D'Ante Smith who was selected by the Cincinnati Bengals.

Every April, each National Football League (NFL) franchise seeks to add new players to its roster through a collegiate draft officially known as "the NFL Annual Player Selection Meeting" but more commonly known as the NFL Draft. Generally, the team with the worst record the previous year picks first, the next-worst team second, and so on. Teams that did not make the playoffs are ordered by their regular-season record with any remaining ties broken by strength of schedule. Playoff participants are sequenced after non-playoff teams, based on their round of elimination (wild card, division, conference, and Super Bowl).  See NFL Draft Rules for further detail. Selections are made during seven different rounds.

Teams have the option of trading their picks to other teams in exchange for different picks, players, money, or a combination thereof. It is not uncommon for a team's actual draft pick to differ from their assigned draft pick, or for a team to have extra or no draft picks in any round due to these trades. Of the players selected in each draft and throughout its history, East Carolina has had 63 players picked.

The Pirates have had two first round selections in the NFL Draft; linebacker Robert Jones was picked #24 overall in the 1992 by the Dallas Cowboys,and running back Chris Johnson was also picked #24 overall in the 2008 NFL Draft by the Tennessee Titans. The Pirates have had six players drafted by the New York Giants and five by the Dallas Cowboys and four by the Minnesota Vikings during the school's history.  East Carolina most productive year was 1984, when the school had eight players selected in the draft.

Seven former Pirates: Zack Valentine (XIV), Earnest Byner (XXVI), Robert Jones (XXX), Guy Whimper (XLII), C.J. Wilson (Super Bowl XLV), Vonta Leach (Super Bowl XLVII), and John Jett (XXVII, XXX)  have won Super Bowls with their respective teams.  Five Pirates also have been elected to the Pro Bowl: Tony Collins (1983), Earnest Byner, (1990) and (1991), Jeff Blake, (1995), Rod Coleman (2005) and Chris Johnson (2008), (2009) and (2010).

Key

Player selection

Notes

References

East Carolina Pirates

East Carolina Pirates NFL Draft